Clarica can refer to:

Clarica or Claricia, a 13th-century nun and illuminator
Clarica Life Assurance, a Canadian insurer based in Waterloo, Ontario